Ebrahim Loveinian (born 10 September 1978) is an Iranian football midfielder who currently plays for Persisam Putra Samarinda in the Indonesia Super League.

Club career
Played with Sepahan for three seasons and then joined Aboumoslem for one season.

Club career statistics

 Assist Goals

Honours
Iran's Premier Football League
Runner up: 1
2007/08 with Sepahan
Iranian Cup
Winner: 1
2006/07 with Sepahan
AFC Champions League
Runner Up: 1
2007 with Sepahan

References

External sources
 Profile at PersianLeague.

1978 births
Living people
Iranian footballers
Association football midfielders
Sepahan S.C. footballers
F.C. Aboomoslem players
Damash Gilan players